The 1962 Clemson Tigers football team was an American football team that represented Clemson University in the Atlantic Coast Conference (ACC) during the 1962 NCAA University Division football season. In its 23rd season under head coach Frank Howard, the team compiled a 6–4 record (5–1 against conference opponents), finished second in the ACC, and outscored opponents by a total of 168 to 130. The team played its home games at Memorial Stadium in Clemson, South Carolina.

Dave Hynes was the team captain. The team's statistical leaders included Jim Parker with 431 passing yards, Pat Crain with 348 rushing yards, Johnny Case with 213 receiving yards, and Charlie Dumas with 30 points scored (5 touchdowns).

Schedule

References

Clemson
Clemson Tigers football seasons
Clemson Tigers football